Neozygites slavi is a microscopic fungus in the order Entomophthorales, which affects aphids, particularly Slavum esfandiarii.

References

Further reading
 Retamal, Cristian Montalva, et al. "Neozygites osornensis sp. nov., a fungal species causing mortality to the cypress aphid Cinara cupressi in Chile". Mycologia. 105.3 (2013): 661–669.

External links
 
 MycoBank

Insect diseases
Animal fungal diseases
Zygomycota